Jorge Antonio Ortiz Ortiz (born June 1, 1984 in Concepción) is a Bolivian football defender. He currently plays for Oriente Petrolero in the Liga de Fútbol Profesional Boliviano.

External links
 
 
 

1984 births
Living people
2007 Copa América players
Association football defenders
Bolivian footballers
Bolivia international footballers
C.D. Jorge Wilstermann players
Club Blooming players
Club Bolívar players
Oriente Petrolero players
People from Ñuflo de Chávez Province
The Strongest players